Cardiff North  may refer to:

 Cardiff North (geographical area)
 Cardiff North (UK Parliament constituency)
 Cardiff North (Senedd constituency)